Vilho Ilmari Pyykkö (born November 17, 1944) is currently a professor and the head of the Hearing and Balance Research Unit at Tampere University School of Medicine. He is a specialist in Oto-rhino-laryngology. Prof. Pyykko has been awarded numerous awards and grants for research including an Honor Award from the American Academy of Otolaryngology in 2000.

Education
Pyykkӧ attended the University of Helsinki and received his Licentiate of Medicine (1971) and later his Doctorate of Medical Sciences (1974). In 1981 he received the qualification of Docent in Oto-, Rhino-, and Laryngology from the University of Lund and again in 1984 from the University of Helsinki.

Work
Pyykkӧ began his career as a research associate at the University of Helsinki under the Department of Physiology from 1971-1973. From 1977-1983 he was a resident at the University Hospital of Lund where the later half of his time there was spent as a specialist and senior physician. Next he spent a year as a senior researcher at the Institute of Occupational Health. He held various positions with University Hospital of Helsinki from 1991-1995 including clinical teacher, professor, and Vc. Professor of Ear, Nose, and Throat Diseases. In 1995 he started working as a professor and the Head of the section of Otorhinolaryngology at Karolinska Institute in Stockholm and continued this position until 2002. During this time he acted as prefect of the Institute of Ear and Skin at Karolinska Institute from 1997-1999. In 2002 he accepted a position as professor in the Department of Ear, Nose and Throat Disease at Tampere University Hospital where he currently holds the position as head of the hearing and balance research unit.

He is a member of eight editorial boards and has supervised of 25 doctoral dissertations.

Research and publications
Prof. Pyykkӧ has been awarded numerous research grants and has published more than 500 scientific publications.  His research range from surgery to rehabilitation. He is considered an expert in various areas including: vestibular assessment and management (specifically Meniere’s disease); applications of nanotechnology in hearing science; advanced imaging techniques in visualizing hearing and balance structures; and internet-based rehabilitation.

References

1944 births
Tampere University of Technology alumni
University of Helsinki alumni
Finnish surgeons
Otolaryngologists
Living people